This article is a list of saints canonized by Pope Paul VI. Pope Paul VI canonized 84
saints during his reign as Pope from 1963 to 1978:

See also
List of saints canonized by Pope Leo XIII
List of saints canonized by Pope Pius XI
List of saints canonized by Pope Pius XII
List of saints canonized by Pope John Paul II
List of saints canonized by Pope Benedict XVI
List of saints canonized by Pope Francis

References

Paul VI
 
\